Kaviyoor is a village located in Thiruvalla Taluk In Pathanamthitta district of Kerala India, situated on the western bank of the Manimala River.It Comes Under Thiruvalla Sub-District & Thiruvalla Constituency.

Demographics
Area: 12.67 km²
Population Data:(According to the 2011 census)
Total: 16,852 (increased by 3.32% from 2001)
Male Population: 7,778 (46.15%)
Female Population: 9074 (53.85%)
Population Density: 1330 per square km
Literacy: 98.27% , Male 98.64% (7,040), Female 97.96% (8,224)
(Note: These figures are based on statistics of Census Dept.
The summary given by them is different:
Literacy 98.27%, M 98.64%, F 97.96%)

Majority of the residents belong to the Hindu community. The total population is estimated to be about 16,852 people with a literacy rate of about 97%.

See also
 Kaviyoor Mahadevar Temple
 Pathanamthitta

References

External links

Caves of Kerala
Villages in Pathanamthitta district
Hindu temples in Pathanamthitta district
Villages in Thiruvalla taluk